Ralph Brown (born 1957) is an English actor.

Ralph Brown may also refer to:
 Ralph Brown (sculptor) (1928–2013), British sculptor
 Ralph Brown (cornerback) (born 1978), American football player
 Ralph Brown (American football, born 1926) (1926–2016), American football player and coach
 Sir Ralph Kilner Brown (1909–2003), British Army officer, judge and athlete
 Ralph M. Brown (1908–1966), member of the California State Assembly
 Ralph S. Brown (1913–1998), American law professor
 Ralph Brown (footballer) (born 1944), English footballer
 Ralph Brown, American actor who appeared in the 1981 slasher film Final Exam

See also
 Ralph Browne, MP for Weymouth and Melcombe Regis
 Ralf Brown's Interrupt List, a comprehensive list of system internal information for x86 machines up to the year 2000